Nanoarchaeota (Greek, "dwarf or tiny ancient one") are a phylum of the Archaea. This phylum currently has only one representative, Nanoarchaeum equitans.

Taxonomy
53 marker proteins based GTDB 07-RS207 phylogeny.

The currently accepted taxonomy is based on the List of Prokaryotic names with Standing in Nomenclature (LPSN) and National Center for Biotechnology Information (NCBI).

 Class Nanobdellia Kato et al. 2022
 Order Nanobdellales Kato et al. 2022
 Family Nanobdellaceae Kato et al. 2022
 Genus Nanobdella Kato et al. 2022
 N. aerobiophila Kato et al. 2022
 Class "Nanoarchaeia" Vazquez-Campos et al. 2021 ["Nanoarchaea" Huber et al. 2011]
 Order "Pacearchaeales"  (DHVE-5, DUSEL-1)
 Order "Woesearchaeales"  (DHVE-6)
 Order "Nanoarchaeales" Huber et al. 2011
 Family "Nanoarchaeaceae" Huber et al. 2011
 Genus "Nanoarchaeum" Huber et al. 2002
 "N. equitans" Huber et al. 2002
 Family "Nanopusillaceae" Huber et al. 2011
 Genus "Candidatus Nanoclepta" St. John et al. 2019
 "Ca. N. minuta" St. John et al. 2019
 Genus "Candidatus Nanopusillus" Wurch et al. 2016
 "Ca. N. acidilobi" Wurch et al. 2016
 "Ca. N. stetteri" (Castelle et al. 2015) Rinke et al. 2020
 Order "Tiddalikarchaeales" Vazquez-Campos et al. 2021
 Family "Tiddalikarchaeaceae" Vazquez-Campos et al. 2021
 Genus "Candidatus Tiddalikarchaeum" Vazquez-Campos et al. 2021
 "Ca. T. anstoanum" Vazquez-Campos et al. 2021
 Order "Parvarchaeales" Rinke et al. 2020
 Family "Acidifodinimicrobiaceae" Luo et al. 2020
 Genus ?"Candidatus Acidifodinimicrobium" Luo et al. 2020
 "Ca. A. mancum" Luo et al. 2020
 Family "Parvarchaeaceae" Rinke et al. 2020 (ARMAN 4 & 5)
 Genus "Candidatus Parvarchaeum" Baker et al. 2010
 "Ca. P. acidiphilum" Baker et al. 2010
 "Ca. P. paracidiphilum" corrig. Baker et al. 2010

See also
 List of Archaea genera

References

Further reading

Scientific journals

Scientific books

Scientific databases

External links

Archaea phyla